Britt Vonk (born 11 April 1991) is a Dutch softball player, who has represented the Dutch national team in international competitions. She attended and played for the University of California, Berkeley.

Since 2001 Vonk has played for the Tex Town Tigers, her hometown club team. She is a shortstop, first baseman, and second baseman who bats left-handed and throws right-handed. She has competed for the Dutch national team since 2008. She was the best batter at the 2008 J.C.J. Mastenbroek Tournament. She was part of the Dutch team for the 2008 Summer Olympics in Beijing, the team's youngest player at 17 years old.

In 2010 she arrived at Cal as a freshman, immediately distinguishing herself by leading the team in both batting average and on-base percentage. She majored in Psychology.

External links
 Vonk at calbears.com
 Vonk at dutchsoftballteam.com

References

1991 births
Living people
Dutch softball players
Olympic softball players of the Netherlands
Softball players at the 2008 Summer Olympics
Sportspeople from Enschede
Scrap Yard Dawgs players
California Golden Bears softball players